It's About a Little Bird is a 2013 children's picture book written and illustrated by American actress-photographer Jessica Lange. The fairy tale includes elements of fantasy, adventure novels, and mystery fiction. The tale revolves around friendship, love and family determination, imagination and exploration. The author has stated that it is based on incidents in her own life, and is illustrated with photographs that she took of her granddaughters.

The work was originally created for her grandchildren. It tells of sisters Ilse and Adah who find a gilded birdcage in their grandmother's barn. The black-and-white photographs used were color hand tinted by Lange.

Lange did find a gilded birdcage in the barn when she purchased her residence, and it was rumored that US actor John Wayne had once owned it. Lange also related that she once smuggled a beloved canary onto an airline flight from Italy to the United States by carrying it in her pocket.

Reception

Critical response
Entertainment Weekly wrote in their review "the artwork in this singularly beautiful children's book, featuring photos hand-tinted by the American Horror Story star, will captivate kids as will the tale of two girls who learn the family story behind an old birdcage".

Art exhibitions

Art fairs and festivals

See also 

 Jessica Lange awards 
 Jessica Lange bibliography
 Jessica Lange discography
 Jessica Lange filmography

References

Sources

External links

 Jessica Lange - It's About a Little Bird (official website on Sourcebooks)
 

2013 children's books
American children's books
American picture books
Photographic collections and books
Books of photographs
English-language books
Works about twin sisters
Books about birds
Fictional canaries
Farms in fiction
Books by Jessica Lange
Sourcebooks books